Conwy Lloyd Morgan, FRS (6 February 1852 – 6 March 1936) was a British ethologist and psychologist. He is remembered for his theory of emergent evolution, and for the experimental approach to animal psychology now known as Morgan's Canon, a principle that played a major role in behaviourism, insisting that higher mental faculties should only be considered as explanations if lower faculties could not explain a behaviour.

Life 
Conwy Lloyd Morgan was born in London and studied at the Royal School of Mines and subsequently under T. H. Huxley. He taught in Cape Town, but in 1884 joined the staff of the then University College, Bristol as Professor of Geology and Zoology, and carried out some research of local interest in those fields. However, he quickly became interested in the field he called "mental evolution", the borderland between intelligence and instinct, and in 1901 moved to become the college's first Professor of Psychology and Education. He was elected a Fellow of the Royal Society in 1899, and gave the Croonian Lecture in 1901, titled Studies in visual sensation.

In addition to his scientific work, Lloyd Morgan was active in academic administration. He became Principal of the University College, Bristol, in 1891 and played a central role in the campaign to secure it full university status. In 1909, when, with the award of a Royal Charter, the college became the University of Bristol, he was appointed as its first Vice-Chancellor, an office he held for a year before deciding to become Professor of Psychology and Ethics until his retirement in 1919. He was president of the Aristotelian Society from 1926 to 1927.

Following his retirement, Morgan delivered a series of Gifford Lectures at St. Andrews in 1921 and 1922 in which he discussed the concept of emergent evolution. He died in Hastings.

Ethology

Morgan's Canon 

Morgan's Canon played a critical role in the growth of behaviourism in twentieth century academic psychology. The canon states: In no case may we interpret an action as the outcome of the exercise of a higher mental faculty, if it can be interpreted as the exercise of one which stands lower in the psychological scale. For example, Morgan considered that an entity should only be considered conscious if there is no other explanation for its behaviour.

W.H. Thorpe commented as follows:

The development of Morgan's Canon derived partly from his observations of behaviour. This provided cases where behaviour that seemed to imply higher mental processes could be explained by simple trial and error learning (what we would now call operant conditioning). An example is the skilful way in which his terrier Tony opened the garden gate, easily imagined as an insightful act by someone seeing the final behaviour. Lloyd Morgan, however, had watched and recorded the series of approximations by which the dog had gradually learned the response, and could demonstrate that no insight was required to explain it.

Instinct versus learning 
Morgan carried out extensive research to separate, as far as possible, inherited behaviour from learnt behaviour. Eggs of chicks, ducklings and moorhens were raised in an incubator, and the hatchlings kept from adult birds. Their behaviour after hatching was recorded in detail. Lastly, the behaviour was interpreted as simply as possible. Morgan was not the first to work on these questions. Douglas Spalding in the 1870s had done some remarkable work on inherited behaviour in birds. His early death in 1877 led to his work being largely forgotten until the 1950s, but Morgan cited Spalding's observations in his own work.

Quotations
Given two different minds and the same facts, how different are the products!  Animal Life and Intelligence (1891), page 335

Books

The springs of conduct: an essay in evolution. (1885). Kegan Paul, London.
Animal biology. (1887). Rivington, London.
Animal sketches. [1891]. Arnold, London.
Animal life and intelligence. (1891). Arnold, London.
Introduction to comparative psychology. (1894). Routledgethoemmes, London.
Psychology for teachers. (1894). Arnold, London.
Habit and instinct. (1896). Arnold, London.
Animal behaviour. (1900). Arnold, London.
The interpretation of nature. (1906).
Instinct and experience. (1912). Methuen, London.
Spencer's Philosophy of Science. (1919). Oxford University Press.
Emergent evolution. (1923). Henry Holt.
Life, mind, and spirit. (1925). Henry Holt.
Creation by evolution. (1928). The Macmillan Company, New York.
Mind at the crossways. (1929).
Animal Mind. (1930). Arnold,  London
The emergence of novelty. (1933).

References

External links

 
 
Biography of Lloyd Morgan
Discussion Lloyd Morgan's canon as applied to consciousness

1852 births
1936 deaths
Academics of the University of Bristol
Animal cognition writers
English psychologists
English zoologists
Ethologists
Fellows of the Royal Society
People educated at Royal Grammar School, Guildford
Presidents of the Aristotelian Society
Vice-Chancellors of the University of Bristol